Louis Gardner MacDowell was a researcher for the United States Department of Agriculture (USDA). With Edwin L. Moore and C. D. Atkins in the 1940s, he helped develop a new process for making concentrated orange juice. All three men were inducted together into the Florida Agricultural Hall of Fame in 1986 for their contributions to the Citrus Industry.

MacDowell died in July 1986 at his home in Lakeland, Florida.

References

External links
Article about Dr. MacDowell
Prominent UF alumni list

American food scientists
People from Winter Haven, Florida
University of Florida alumni
1986 deaths
Year of birth missing